Fernanda G. Weiden is a free software advocate and CTO at the brazilian multinational VTEX. She has worked for Debian, Google and Facebook.

Personal life 
Fernanda Weiden was raised in Porto Alegre, Brazil. She is married with one child. She moved to Europe in 2019.

Career 

Fernanda Weiden became involved with the Free software movement in 1997 and then became an advocate for free software. In June 2003, Fernanda Weiden and Loimar Vianna founded Projeto Software Livre Mulheres. She is an example of cyberfeminism, along with developers such as Alice Wu and Yuwei Lin.

Weiden was a sponsored Debian contributor; she was a member of Debian Women and participated until 2011. In 2004, she started a thread complaining about the prospective package hot-babe, which featured drawings of a girl undressing.

On 16 September 2006, she participated in two panels at Wizards of OS 4 in Berlin; Weiden was one of the speakers in The Future of Free Software, together with Atul Chitnis and Federico Heinz. The previous day, Larry Sanger announced Citizendium; She was interviewed about the open source situation in Latin America.

In FISL 12, Weiden managed a course for women about system administration. In FISL 15, she talked about failures in large-scale systems.

Weiden worked for six years at Google and then moved to Facebook, where she became director of engineering and production. After seven years at Facebook, she joined Brazilian company Unico. In September 2021, Weiden was promoted to the board of Unico, after previously being vice-president of engineering.

Selected works

References

External links
 Personal blog

Living people
Google employees
Year of birth missing (living people)